The Fortress is a 2017 South Korean historical drama film directed by Hwang Dong-hyuk, starring Lee Byung-hun and Kim Yoon-seok. It is based on the novel Namhansanseong by Kim Hoon.

Plot
The film is set during the Qing invasion of Joseon in 1636, when King Injo and his retainers sought refuge in the fortress located in Namhansanseong.

Cast

Main
Lee Byung-hun as Choi Myung-kil
A leader of one of the two ideological cliques that battles in the fortress trying to decide whether to make peace or fight against the Qing dynasty.
Kim Yoon-seok as Kim Sang-hun
The other leader of the ideological clique who battles with Choi's opinion and firmly believes in defending the nation's dignity by fighting against the Qing dynasty.
Park Hae-il as King Injo 
The king who is in agony in the tense conflicts between his men over the fate of the nation. 
Go Soo as Seo Nal-soe 
A blacksmith sent out with a king's letter to recruit loyal forces. 
Park Hee-soon as Lee Shi-baek
The commander of the Namhansanseong garrison, silently defending the mountain fortress in the extreme cold weather conditions.

Supporting
Song Young-chang as Kim Ryoo
Jo Woo-jin as Jung Myung-soo
Lee David as Chil-bok
Heo Sung-tae as Yong Gol-dae
Kim Beop-rae as Hong Taiji 
Jo Ah-in as Na-roo
Jin Seon-kyu as Lee Doo-gap
Yoo Soon-woong as Chief Scholar
Park Ji-il as Deputy Chief Scholar 
Choi Jong-ryul as Eunuch
Kim Joong-ki as First Secretary
Shin Ki-joon as Crown Prince

Release and reception
The film was released in South Korean cinemas on October 3, 2017. It topped the box office on its opening day with 444,527 viewers. According to the film's distributor CJ Entertainment, by the second day of its release, the film had accumulated more than one million admissions, the fastest film released during the Chuseok holidays to surpass the mark.

The Fortress was sold to 28 countries worldwide including U.S.A, Japan, Taiwan and Singapore. It was the opening film at the 2nd London East Asia Film Festival. In South Korea, the film attracted a total of 3.8 million moviegoers.

Awards and nominations

References

External links
 
 

 

2017 films
South Korean historical drama films
Films set in the 1630s
Films set in the Joseon dynasty
CJ Entertainment films
2010s historical drama films
Drama films based on actual events
2017 drama films
Manchu-language films
2010s South Korean films